Barkava Parish is an administrative unit of Madona Municipality, Latvia. The earliest source noting Barkava Parish as a territory dates back to 1866. In 1873 Barkava Parish merged with Murmastiene Parish. The first noted area of Barkava Parish was 277.2 km², and was located in Rezekne District. The first noted population was 5235 inhabitants according to the Fourth Population and Housing Census in Latvia.

References 

Parishes of Latvia
Madona Municipality